Fairfax Station is a census-designated place (CDP) in Fairfax County, Virginia, United States. The population was 12,030 at the 2010 census.

Geography

Fairfax Station is located in western Fairfax County, between Clifton to the west, Burke to the east, and the city of Fairfax to the north. The original community of Fairfax Station is located in the eastern part of the CDP, where State Route 123 (Ox Road) crosses the Norfolk Southern Railway line. State Route 286, the Fairfax County Parkway, curves through the center of the CDP, leading northwest to Fair Lakes and southeast to Newington.

Population densities range from 200 to 500 per square mile (77 to 193 per square kilometer) in the northern, southern, and western portions of the CDP, to between 1,600 and 2,200 per square mile (584 to 849 per square kilometer) in the center and eastern portions.

Demographics
As of the census of 2010, there were 12,030 people, 4,070 households, and 3,497 families residing in the CDP. The racial makeup of the CDP was 78.9% White, 3.9% African American, 0.1% Native American, 12.2% Asian, 0.04% Pacific Islander, 1.7% some other race, and 3.2% from two or more races. Hispanic or Latino of any race were 7.2% of the population.

There were 4,070 households, out of which 38.7% had children under the age of 18 living with them, 77.6% were headed by married couples living together, 5.9% had a female householder with no husband present, and 14.1% were non-families. 10.6% of all households were made up of individuals, and 3.7% were someone living alone who was 65 years of age or older. The average household size was 2.95, and the average family size was 3.16.

In the CDP, the population was spread out, with 24.2% under the age of 18, 7.5% from 18 to 24, 18.3% from 25 to 44, 38.1% from 45 to 64, and 12.0% who were 65 years of age or older. The median age was 45.0 years. For every 100 females, there were 100.6 males. For every 100 females age 18 and over, there were 99.5 males.

For the period 2010 through 2014, the estimated median annual income for a household in the CDP was $163,796, and the median income for a family was $180,091. Male full-time workers had a median income of $125,760 versus $75,119 for females. The per capita income for the CDP was $67,357. About 0.7% of families and 1.8% of the population were below the poverty line, including 1.3% of those under age 18.

Averages

The average lifestyle for residents of Fairfax Station rates above those of the national index in categories including total household expenditure, insurance, clothing, education, entertainment, food, health care, personal care, tobacco, transportation, utilities, and gifts. The factors that are below average when compared to the national (lowest in the state for many of them): crime rate, personal crime risk, murder risk, rape risk, larceny risk, and automotive theft risk.

Schools
The education system in Fairfax County is among the top public school counties in the country. The children of Fairfax Station go to six elementary schools; William Halley Elementary for the southern part of Fairfax Station and Silverbrook Elementary for the northern part. They can also attend Fairview Elementary, Oak View Elementary, Bonnie Brae Elementary or Sangster Elementary. After 6th grade, the last year in all of the elementary schools, students enter one of four public schools: South County Middle School (feeder school for South County High School), Robinson Secondary School, Robert Frost Middle School (feeder for W.T. Woodson High School), or Lake Braddock Secondary School.

The private school Islamic Saudi Academy previously had its West Campus in Fairfax Station.

Transportation
Residents are dependent on private cars for most transportation. Local roads include Route 123 (Ox Road) and Fairfax County Parkway. Some commute using Virginia Railway Express. Fairfax Station is home to the Fairfax Station Railroad Museum, devoted to local railroad history.

History

Established  in 1851, Fairfax Station was originally a station of the Orange and Alexandria Railroad, with proximity to the county seat of Fairfax; it was known as "Lee's Station" during its first year. During the Civil War in August 1862, Clara Barton tended to wounded Union and Confederate troops at the station after the Second Battle of Bull Run (Manassas), with headquarters at nearby St. Mary's Church. An employee of the U.S. Patent Office in Washington at the start of the war, Barton later founded the American Red Cross in 1881.  A small skirmish, which was also the last in the county during the war, was fought at Brimstone Hill near Fairfax Station.

The construction of St. Mary's began in 1858, and it was the first Catholic church in Fairfax County. Its parishioners were primarily Irish immigrants, employed by the railroad. The area was renamed Swetnam in 1897, and reverted to Fairfax Station in 1921. Ekoji Buddhist Temple is also located in Fairfax Station, built  in 1998.

Notable people
Bob Hall, Republican member of the Texas State Senate, former resident of Fairfax Station
John Jackson, blues singer and guitarist
Rebiya Kadeer, political activist
David Lereah, author and businessman
Doug Limerick, radio personality
Kjell Lindgren, astronaut 
Bob McEwen, former member of the United States House of Representatives
Alex Riley, professional wrestler
Wolfgang W. E. Samuel, author and United States Air Force veteran
William Lloyd Scott, former United States Senator
Steve Scully, former senior executive producer and political editor for C-SPAN
Clarence Thomas, Associate Justice, United States Supreme Court

References

External links

Fairfax Station Railroad Museum
Fairfax County History Commission

Census-designated places in Fairfax County, Virginia
Washington metropolitan area
Census-designated places in Virginia